The Lau'agae Ridge Quarry is a prehistoric stone quarry on the eastern side of the island of Tutuila in the United States territory of American Samoa.  It is located on a ridge above another archaeological site, the prehistoric village of Tulauta.  The site includes a carpet of stone flakes, evidence of rough stonework (creating forms probably finished in Tulauta), signs of habitation, and two tia'ave, oval stone platforms found in abundance on the island.

The quarry site was listed on the National Register of Historic Places in 2000.

See also
National Register of Historic Places listings in American Samoa

References

Quarries in the United States
Tutuila
Archaeological sites on the National Register of Historic Places in American Samoa